Americans for Responsible Solutions (ARS) was a United States non-profit organization and super PAC that supports gun control. The group's stated goal was "to encourage elected officials to stand up for solutions to prevent gun violence and protect responsible gun ownership." It typically supported Democratic politicians in elections. In 2016, the organization merged with the Law Center to Prevent Gun Violence to become Giffords.

History
ARS was formed by Gabby Giffords, a former Democratic member of the U.S. House of Representatives, and her husband, Mark Kelly, in the weeks following the Sandy Hook Elementary School shooting of December 14, 2012. Giffords' political career ended on January 8, 2011, when she and 18 others were shot at a meeting with constituents in a suburb of Tucson, Arizona.

Giffords and Kelly said they sought to reduce gun violence by matching the gun lobby in its reach and resources. In a network news interview, Kelly said he went through a background check to buy a gun at a store and that private firearms sales should also require checks. Three days later, the Wall Street Journal said that Americans for Responsible Solutions and Mayors Against Illegal Guns were "emerging as key voices in the gun control effort."

Mission
Americans for Responsible Solutions supported getting the names of everyone not allowed to buy a gun into the background check system, a mandatory background check for every gun purchase or transfer of possession, including between private citizens, limiting domestic abusers' access to firearms, stopping gun trafficking, preventing the carrying of firearms in certain locations, and maintaining silencers as a title II device.

Gun control advocacy
In January 2013, two years after being shot and one month after the Sandy Hook shooting, Giffords was a witness at a congressional hearing on gun violence, where she called for Congress to pass tougher laws on guns. In his testimony, Kelly called for a "careful and civil conversation" regarding guns.

Federal law requires licensed firearms dealers to perform background checks on purchasers, but it does not require private citizens to run checks. In March 2013, Kelly said that "any bill that does not include a universal background check is a mistake. It's the most common-sense thing we can do to prevent criminals and the mentally ill from having access to weapons."

In April 2013, after a bi-partisan bill to expand background checks failed to pass the Senate, Americans for Responsible Solutions issued a statement from Giffords and Kelly saying that senators who voted against the bill put gun lobby leaders before their constituents. The day after the vote, Kelly said the 2014 elections were "a target rich environment after yesterday."

In August 2013, ARS returned three donations, one from Bette Midler, after the Center for Public Integrity reported that the donations were prohibited by the Internal Revenue Service, which does not allow tax-deductible donations from nonprofits to super PACs.

Electoral activity

2014 congressional elections
In October 2013, ARS reported that it wanted to spend $19 million in the 2014 elections, which was the same amount the NRA spent in 2012. , donors had contributed over $11 million to the group. On November 8, 2013, a sister organization was announced, Veterans for Responsible Solutions, who visited Congress and wrote op-eds. In June 2014, ARS Executive Director Pia Carusone said it would meet and exceed the fundraising goal it set at the start of the 2014 campaign.

ARS ran advertisements in the 2014 election cycle opposing Republican U.S. Senate candidate Joni Ernst in Iowa. ARS endorsed Ernst's Democratic opponent, Bruce Braley. ARS also endorsed Democratic U.S. Senate candidates Mark Udall, Mary Landrieu, Jeanne Shaheen, Kay Hagan, Gary Peters and Al Franken and Republican U.S. Senate candidate Susan Collins.

In the 2014 election cycle, nearly one-third of the organization's spending went to bolster the campaign of Ron Barber, a former Giffords aide who ultimately lost his Arizona congressional seat to Republican Martha McSally. ARS reported spending $6.9 million in the 2014 cycle, $2 million for Democrats and $4.2 million against Republicans. Of that money, $238,000 went to support Ron Barber and $1.8 million went to oppose McSally.

ARS stopped running a controversial anti-McSally advertisement that was deemed "vile" by the Arizona Republic.  The advertisement accused McSally of supporting policies that made it easier for stalkers to get guns. Overall in 2014, ARS lost more congressional races than it won.

2016 elections
Among the ARS endorsements in the 2016 federal elections were Republican senators Pat Toomey of Pennsylvania and Mark Kirk of Illinois. According to Giffords, they "broke from the gun lobby and supported a bill to help prevent felons, domestic abusers and the dangerously mentally ill from obtaining firearms at gun shows and online." Endorsement for Mark Kirk was later withdrawn after he mocked the Asian heritage of his opponent, Rep. Tammy Duckworth (D-Ill.).

Other senate endorsements include Democrats Michael Bennet of Colorado, Catherine Cortez Masto of Nevada, and Jason Kander of Missouri.

Creating Giffords
In 2016, Americans for Responsible Solutions joined the Law Center to Prevent Gun Violence and launched a joint organization known as Giffords.

References

External links
Americans for Responsible Solutions

501(c)(4) nonprofit organizations
Gun control advocacy groups in the United States
Organizations established in 2013
2013 establishments in Washington, D.C.
Sandy Hook Elementary School shooting
2011 Tucson shooting